Johan Werner Kankkonen (11 July 1886 – 3 February 1955) was a Finnish road racing cyclist who competed in the 1912 Summer Olympics. He was born in Kokkola and died in Ylivieska.

In 1912 he was a member of the Finnish cycling team which finished fifth in the team time trial event. In the individual time trial competition he finished 34th.

References

1886 births
1955 deaths
Finnish male cyclists
Olympic cyclists of Finland
Cyclists at the 1912 Summer Olympics
People from Kokkola
Sportspeople from Central Ostrobothnia